Two ships of the United States Navy have borne the name Brownson, in honor of Rear Admiral Willard H. Brownson:

References

United States Navy ship names